Signes may refer to:
 "Signes" (song), a 2005 single by Nâdiya
 Signes, Var, a commune in the Var department in France
 Signes, a corner on the Circuit Paul Ricard

See also
 Signs (disambiguation)